Özker Özgür was a leading Turkish-Cypriot politician. Özgür, whose last name means "free" was born in 1940 in the village of Vretça, Paphos District, Cyprus. During 1961–1975 he worked as a secondary school English teacher on the island. With the votes of the teachers, he was elected to the founding parliament of the Turkish Federated State of Cyprus in 1975. Between 1976 and 1996 he served as the leader of the Republican Turkish Party CTP in Cyprus. In the early general elections of 1993 he was elected to the Parliament and served as the Deputy Prime Minister and State Minister for North Cyprus.

In 1997 he stepped down as the chairman of the Republican Turkish Party due to internal party politics. He continued his political life as a member of the New Cyprus Party which then continued as the United Cyprus Party.

Özker Özgür died on 22 November 2005.

1940 births
2005 deaths
People from Paphos District
Republican Turkish Party politicians
United Cyprus Party politicians
Members of the Assembly of the Republic (Northern Cyprus)